The Henfield House is a historic First Period house in Lynnfield, Massachusetts.  The oldest portion of this 2.5-story saltbox colonial was built c. 1700; this consisted of the right side of the house (including the shed section to its rear) and the central chimney.  The left side was built early in the 18th century.  The only other major modification was the addition of a shed dormer in the early 20th century, and some single story additions extending from the rear of the house on the east side.  The house is named for the owners during most of the 18th century.

The house was listed on the National Register of Historic Places in 1991.

See also
National Register of Historic Places listings in Essex County, Massachusetts

References

Buildings and structures in Lynnfield, Massachusetts
Houses in Essex County, Massachusetts
Houses on the National Register of Historic Places in Essex County, Massachusetts
Colonial architecture in Massachusetts
Saltbox architecture in Massachusetts